Anne-Marie Martin (born Edmonda Benton; November 11, 1957) is a Canadian retired actress, screenwriter and equestrian who is perhaps best known for playing Sgt. Dori Doreau in the American television comedy series Sledge Hammer! from 1986 to 1988, as well as her roles in several horror films, such as Prom Night (1980) and The Boogens (1981).

Early life
Martin was born Edmonda Benton in Toronto, Ontario on November 11, 1957. Prior to embarking on a screen acting career, she worked for theater director Hrant Alianak in Toronto, performing at the Theatre Passe Muraille.

Career 
In her early career, Martin was credited under the name Eddie Benton, most notably in the unsuccessful series pilot/telefilm Dr. Strange (1978), for which she was paid $2,000 a week. She subsequently appeared in the slasher film Prom Night (1980), Savage Harvest (1981), The Boogens (1981), and had a cameo in  Halloween II (1981); as well as numerous TV series guest roles. Among these were Stella Breed, a woman with psychokinetic powers in the Buck Rogers in the 25th Century episode "Twiki is Missing", and an officer who faces an amputation after injury in the line of duty on T. J. Hooker.

Prior to this she appeared in The Shape of Things to Come (1979), a low-budget Canadian science fiction film that attempted to capitalize on the popularity of Star Wars and Battlestar Galactica. She was also a regular on the short-lived 1977 series Rafferty opposite Patrick McGoohan and appeared in the equally short-lived Time Express in 1979.

In the early 1980s, she appeared in a Highway to Heaven episode in which she and Victor French traded bodies.  From 1982 to 1985, she appeared as attorney Gwen Davies on the soap opera Days of Our Lives.  Alan Spencer subsequently cast her in Sledge Hammer!, as Dori Doreau; he also wrote an episode of the series that allowed her to, if not exactly change bodies with Sledge Hammer, at least impersonate him. Martin appeared as Doreau on the series from 1986 until 1988.

Personal life 
Martin married author Michael Crichton in 1987 (she had a small role in Crichton's film Runaway three years earlier), and following the cancellation of Sledge Hammer!, retired from TV and film acting. In 1989, they had a daughter, Taylor-Anne. Martin co-wrote, with Crichton, the screenplay to the 1996 film Twister. The couple separated in 2001 and divorced in 2003.

Martin went on to pursue her love of horses and ride competitively. She rode for Team USA in the World Championship competition for Icelandic horses.

Filmography

Film

Television

Miscellaneous

References

External links

Canadian film actresses
Canadian soap opera actresses
Canadian stage actresses
Canadian television actresses
Living people
Actresses from Toronto
20th-century Canadian actresses
1957 births